Holy Rock School is an English medium school in Nawabhat, situated on the outskirts of Bardhaman, West Bengal, India. It was established in 1982. It has been affiliated to CISCE since 1994.

Primary schools in West Bengal
High schools and secondary schools in West Bengal
Schools in Purba Bardhaman district
1982 establishments in West Bengal
Educational institutions established in 1982